Fernando Espinoza (born 30 December 1968) is a politician from Argentina, and is the current intendente (mayor) of La Matanza.

Political career 
Fernando Espinoza studied in the Jorge Newbery college from San Justo, where he was part of the student center of the institution while he was studying for his high-school degree.
After graduating, he entered the Juventud Peronista (Peronist Youth) and the Movimiento de Unidad, Solidaridad y Organización (MUSO). There, he met Alberto Balestrini, who became his political mentor.
In 1995 he became a secretary in the Juventud Peronista in the Consejo del Partido Justicialista (Justicialist Party Council) in the district of La Matanza.
On 24 October 1999 he was elected as councillor from the party, and chosen by his peers as the president of the Honorable Concejo Deliberante (part of the legislature), a position he would hold from 2002 to 2003, and then again, after being re-elected from 2003 to 2005.

In the year 2005 he abandoned the legislative position and appointed as the Intendente of La Matanza, after Ballestrini was elected as the head of the Cámara de Diputados de La Nación. He was sworn in at the San Justo Cathedral by recognizing himself as a devotee of Nuestra Señora del Buen Viaje.
In the elections for the national executive held on 28 October 2007, he declared himself again as candidate for the city mayor, winning the election with over 50% of the votes.
Espinoza was re-elected as a mayor in the elections held in 2011, with more than 60% of the votes of the citizens, becoming the incumbent mayor.

Mayorship of La Matanza
The government of Espinoza as mayor of La Matanza was marked by the start of a decentralization policy, dividing the territory in communes.
He also founded the Centro de Operaciones Municipales (COM) (District Operations Center) and the Local Patrol in response to a growing request from the population for security improvements. During his administration a local book fair, along with music festivals and artistic events, have been held in the city.
In the health policy, three new hospitals were built between 2005 and 2013.

Recognition
In 2008 he won the Public Service Award, in the category "poverty reduction" by his programs towards the social inclusion.
In September 2009, as part of a charity dinner held once a year by the Obra del Padre Mario Pantaleo, Espinoza got the Solidarity Hand for his "Work for the wealth of the community".

Electoral history

Executive

Legislative

References

External links
 

Mayors of La Matanza, Buenos Aires
Justicialist Party politicians
People from La Matanza Partido
1968 births
Living people
Members of the Argentine Chamber of Deputies elected in Buenos Aires Province